Trogen may refer to:

People
 Karl-Erling Trogen (born 1946)

Places
 Trogen, Switzerland
 Trogen, Bavaria